Alania Suttie (born 23 February 1999) is a Samoan swimmer. She competed in the women's 200 metre butterfly event at the 2017 World Aquatics Championships.

References

External links
 

1999 births
Living people
Samoan female swimmers
Swimmers at the 2018 Commonwealth Games
Commonwealth Games competitors for Samoa
Place of birth missing (living people)
Female butterfly swimmers
20th-century Samoan people
21st-century Samoan people